Pokrovka is a rural locality (a village) in Zilairsky Selsoviet, Baymaksky District, Bashkortostan, Russia. The population was 167 as of 2010. There are 2 streets.

Geography 
Pokrovka is located 57 km east of Baymak (the district's administrative centre) by road. Kultaban is the nearest rural locality.

References 

Rural localities in Baymaksky District